Robert Cornejo (born March 25, 1983) is an American Republican politician. He is a former member of the Missouri House of Representatives from the 64th District, first elected in 2012 and having served into 2018. Cornejo resigned in August 2018 to become chairman of the Labor and Industrial Relations Commission, which oversees Missouri's Department of Labor and Industrial Relations.

Election results

References

1983 births
21st-century American politicians
Living people
Republican Party members of the Missouri House of Representatives
People from St. Louis County, Missouri